The Ukiah area is an area of  in southeastern Mendocino County, California that encompasses the arable valleys of the Russian River drainage system and the adjacent parts of the Mendocino Range Mountains of the Pacific Coast Range.

Geography 

Several shipping points on the railroad in the Ukiah and Sanel Valleys serve surrounding towns and resorts in the Coast Range. Hopland, California grew when the railroad came along, the old business centre from the time of the old toll roads, before the railway, being Old Hopland. Other stops include:
 Echo 
 Cummiskey
A post office operated here from 1891 to 1897. The name honors a local Native American chief.
 Fountain 
A post office operated here from 1889 to 1905, having moved in 1897. The name honors Lemuel F. Long, a settler of 1858; "Largo" is Spanish for "long".
 Henry
El Roble (formerly El Robles) is a Spanish name meaning "the oak(s)".
 Redwood Valley
 Laughlin

References

Bibliography 

 
 
 

Mendocino County, California